John Arthur McColl (February 21, 1875 – April 19, 1933) was a Canadian politician and Member of the Legislative Assembly from Alberta.

He was born at Maxville, Glengarry County, Ontario to Neil McColl and Annie McDougall. He was educated at Maxville Public School and married to Ethel Alguire on February 6, 1901. He had six children and worked as a farmer near Youngstown, Alberta.

McColl, running as a Liberal, was elected to the Alberta legislature for the first time in the 1913 Alberta general election. He defeated Conservative candidate W.D. Bentley by a comfortable margin to win the new Acadia district.

McColl ran for re-election in the 1917 Alberta general election, he retained his seat in a 3-way race that saw the voter turn out in Acadia 4 times higher than the previous election. In that election he defeated future MLA Lorne Proudfoot, running as an independent candidate, who came in a distant 3rd place.

McColl did not run in the 1921 provincial election, and Proudfoot was elected to represent the constituency.

References

External links

Legislative Assembly of Alberta Members Listing

Alberta Liberal Party MLAs
1875 births
1933 deaths